Alexander Rodriguez Colon (born December 21, 1985) is a Puerto Rican male artistic gymnast, representing his nation at international competitions. He won an individual bronze medal in the pommel horse at the 2007 Pan American Games and another bronze medal in the floor exercise at the 2011 Pan American Games.

References

1985 births
Living people
Puerto Rican male artistic gymnasts
Place of birth missing (living people)
Gymnasts at the 2007 Pan American Games
Gymnasts at the 2011 Pan American Games
Pan American Games silver medalists for Puerto Rico
Pan American Games bronze medalists for Puerto Rico
Pan American Games medalists in gymnastics
Medalists at the 2011 Pan American Games